Ochromolopis xeropa is a moth in the family Epermeniidae. It was described by Edward Meyrick in 1911. It is found in South Africa.

References

Endemic moths of South Africa
Epermeniidae
Moths described in 1911
Moths of Africa
Lepidoptera of South Africa